This is a list of the National Register of Historic Places listings in Bee County, Texas.

This is intended to be a complete list of properties listed on the National Register of Historic Places in Bee County, Texas. There are 13 properties listed on the National Register in the county. Five properties are designated as Recorded Texas Historic Landmarks including one that is also a State Antiquities Landmark.

Current listings

The locations of National Register properties may be seen in a mapping service provided.

|}

See also

National Register of Historic Places listings in Texas
Recorded Texas Historic Landmarks in Bee County

References

External links

Registered Historic Places
Bee County
Buildings and structures in Bee County, Texas